is a passenger railway station  located in  Higashinada-ku, Kobe, Hyōgo Prefecture, Japan. It is operated by the West Japan Railway Company (JR West).

Lines

Station layout
The station consists of one elevated island platform with the station building underneath.  The station is staffed.

Platforms

Adjacent stations

History
Kōnan-Yamate Station opened on 1 October 1996.

Station numbering was introduced to the station in March 2018 with Kōnan-Yamate being assigned station number JR-A55.

Passenger statistics
In fiscal 2020, the station was used by an average of 11,516 passengers daily

Surrounding area
Konan Women's University
Konan Girls' Junior and Senior High School
Kobe Municipal Motoyama Third Elementary School

See also
List of railway stations in Japan

References

External links 

 Kōnan-Yamate Station from JR-Odekake.net 

Railway stations in Japan opened in 1996
Tōkaidō Main Line
Railway stations in Kobe